Vishwa Shanti Stupa is a large white Peace Pagoda in Rajgir, Nalanda District, Bihar, near Gitai Mandir. Statues of the Buddha are mounted on the stupa in four directions. It also has a small Japanese Buddhist temple with a large park. There is a temple near the stupa where prayers are conducted for universal peace. The initial pagoda was completed in 1969. New initiatives in 1993 resulted in the present form. It is one of around 80 Peace Pagodas which have been built around the world by the neo-Buddhist organisation Nipponzan Myohoji. These were a dream of Nichidatsu Fujii, inspired by Mohandas K. Gandhi, as a reaction to the atomic bombing of Japan, the first, and more well known Vishwa Shanti stupa, being built on Ratnagiri Hill in Rajgir.

The Stupa

Located on about the top of 400 m high Ratnagiri Hills in the lush-green valley of Rajgir, the white stupa stands 120 ft tall with a total diameter of 103 ft. The stupa is studded with four gold gilded statues of Buddha, showing four important events of his life.

Reference

Further reading
 Siby K. Joseph, Bharat Mahodaya (eds), Essays in Conflict Resolution, Institute of Gandhian Studies, 2007

External links 

 

 Bihar Tourism

Stupas in India
Buddhist buildings